The 12th Gaudí Awards, organised by the Catalan Film Academy, were presented on 19 January 2020 at  in Barcelona. The nominations were read by Anna Castillo and Oriol Pla on 5 December 2019 at La Pedrera's auditorium.

Winners and nominees 
The winners and nominees are listed as follows:

Public's Choice Special Award 
 
 The Platform
 
 The Days to Come
 
 Liberté
 The Innocence
 A Thief's Daughter

Honorary Award 
Filmmaker Francesc Betriu was the recipient of the Gaudí honorary award.

References 

Gaudí Awards
2020 in Catalonia
2020 film awards
21st century in Barcelona
January 2020 events in Spain